Megachile sericans is a species of bee in the family Megachilidae. It was described by Fonscolombe in 1852.

References

Sericans
Insects described in 1852